The year 1919 in architecture involved some significant architectural events and new buildings.

Events
 25 April – The Bauhaus architectural and design movement is founded in Weimar, Germany, by Walter Gropius.
 November – Start of the Glass Chain correspondence.
 Julia Morgan is selected as the architect for William Randolph Hearst's La Cuesta Encantada, better known as Hearst Castle, in San Simeon, California, USA.

Buildings and structures

Buildings opened
 5 March – Rebuilt Helsinki Central railway station, designed by Eliel Saarinen.
 April – First Congregational Church of Albany, New York, USA, designed by Albert W. Fuller.
 September – Brooklyn Army Terminal, New York, USA, designed by Cass Gilbert.
 11 November (Remembrance Day) – Hart House, University of Toronto, Toronto, Ontario, Canada, designed by Henry Sproatt.
 27 November – Laie Hawaii Temple, Oahu, Hawaii, USA, dedicated.
 29 November – Großes Schauspielhaus in Berlin with interior remodelled as a theater by Hans Poelzig.
 Church of the Madonna della Difesa, Montreal, Canada.
 McMahon Building, better known as the "World's littlest skyscraper", by J. D. McMahon, in downtown Wichita Falls, Texas.

Buildings completed
 Het Schip, Amsterdam, Netherlands, by Michel de Klerk.
 First Goetheanum, Dornach, Switzerland, by Rudolf Steiner.

Awards
 RIBA Royal Gold Medal – Leonard Stokes.
 Grand Prix de Rome, architecture – Jacques Carlu and Jean-Jacques Haffner.

Births

 3 January – Robin Boyd, Australian architect (died 1971)
 21 June – Paolo Soleri, Italian-American architect (died 2013)
 23 July – Geoffrey Bawa, Ceylonese architect (died 2003)
 12 December – Giancarlo De Carlo, Italian architect (died 2005)
 date unknown – Mualla Eyüboğlu, Turkish architect (died 2009)

Deaths
 26 February – Paul Due, Norwegian architect of railway stations (born 1835)
 12 August – Ernest Gimson, English "Arts and Crafts" architect and furniture designer (born 1864)
 5 September – Frigyes Schulek, Hungarian architect (born 1841)
 15 October – Adolf W. Edelsvärd, Swedish architect (born 1824)
 6 November – Hans Christian Amberg, Danish architect (born 1837)

References